Washer Woman is a  tall sandstone arch and tower located in the Island in the Sky District of Canyonlands National Park, in San Juan County, Utah. It is situated 300 feet northwest of the slightly higher Monster Tower. Washer Woman is so named because the feature gives the appearance of a washerwoman bent over a washtub. This geographical feature's name was officially adopted in 1986 by the U.S. Board on Geographic Names after previously having similar names such as Washer-Woman Arch and The Washer Woman. Washer Woman and Monster Tower are an eroded fin composed of Wingate Sandstone, which is the remains of wind-borne sand dunes deposited approximately 200 million years ago in the Late Triassic. A short hike to Mesa Arch provides the easiest view of Washer Woman. Access to this formation is via the four-wheel drive White Rim Road, which is the other option to see it. The top of this geological formation rises 1,300 feet above the road in approximately one mile. Precipitation runoff from Washer Woman drains southeast into the nearby Colorado River via Buck Canyon.

Climbing
The first ascent of Washer Woman was made by Maurice Horn, John Horn, and Pete Carmen on Apr 20, 1967, via the South Face. The first ascent of the classic In Search of Suds route on the West Face was made by Glenn Randall and Charlie Fowler in September 1982.

Climate
Spring and fall are the most favorable seasons to visit Washer Woman. According to the Köppen climate classification system, it is located in a Cold semi-arid climate zone, which is defined by the coldest month having an average mean temperature below −0 °C (32 °F) and at least 50% of the total annual precipitation being received during the spring and summer.

Gallery

See also
 Colorado Plateau
 Geology of the Canyonlands area

References

External links
 Canyonlands National Park National Park Service
 Washer Woman: weather forecast
 Washer Woman rock climbing: Mountainproject.com

Landforms of San Juan County, Utah
Colorado Plateau
Canyonlands National Park
Sandstone formations of the United States